An Eye for an Eye is the second studio album by American metalcore band Like Moths to Flames. The album was released on July 9, 2013, through Rise Records and was produced by Will Putney. It's the first album to feature drummer Greg Diamond and the last to feature guitarist Zach Huston.

Critical reception

The album received mostly positive reviews, but also mixed reviews from several critics. Already Heard rated the album 3.5 out of 5 and stated: "Like Moths to Flames are the kind of band you'd probably never pay to see, but would really get into if they were a support band and you'd had a few beers. An Eye for an Eye is the same, it won't change your life but you'll enjoy it while it's playing. It's worth a look, but don't rush out to grab it." Zach Redrup from Dead Press! rated the album positively calling it: "An Eye For An Eye still very much presents things that have already been done by a plethora of bands before time and time again. However, this time around, LMTF have expanded their already preset boundaries and have introduced much more melody and towering hooks that, though present on previous releases were far harder to find and latch onto."

KillYourStereo gave the album 30 out of 100 and said: "Most people probably wouldn't notice if you switched An Eye For An Eye with Like Moths To Flames debut. Generic metalcore at its best." Louder Sound gave the album a slightly negative review and stated: "Like Moths To Flames would be well advised to take a moment to quietly consider the purpose of their existence, because, while there is nothing inherently wrong with An Eye For An Eye, this is an album so derivative, so predictable and so one-dimensional that you have to wonder if they have any self-awareness at all." Rock Sound gave it 7 out of 10 and said: "While we might be a tad spoilt for choice in the metalcore market as of late, Like Moths To Flames' second full-length certainly puts them above the general chasing pack. [...] An Eye for an Eye is a cut above, but on the next album, evolution is key."

Track listing

Personnel
Credits adapted from AllMusic.
 Like Moths to Flames
 Chris Roetter – lead vocals
 Eli Ford – lead guitar
 Zach Huston – rhythm guitar
 Aaron Evans – bass, backing vocals
 Greg Diamond – drums, percussion

 Additional musicians
 Shane Told of Silverstein – guest vocals on track "Into the Ground"
 Ahren Stringer of The Amity Affliction – guest vocals on track "Lord of Bones"

 Additional personnel
 Will Putney – production, engineering, mixing, mastering, composition
 Zakk Cervini – engineering
 Andy Gomoll – editing
 Mike Mowery – management
 JJ Cassiere – booking
 Marco Walzel – booking

References

2013 albums
Like Moths to Flames albums
Rise Records albums
Albums produced by Will Putney